Calbert Nathaniel Cheaney (born July 17, 1971) is an American basketball coach and former player who serves as assistant coach for the Indiana Pacers of the National Basketball Association (NBA). He starred as a player for the Indiana Hoosiers from 1989–93 under coach Bob Knight. Cheaney ended his career as a three-time All-American and remains the Big Ten's all-time leading scorer with 2,613 career points. He led Indiana to a 105–27 record and the NCAA Tournament all four years, including a Final Four appearance in 1992.

At the conclusion of his collegiate basketball career Cheaney captured virtually every post-season honor available, including National Player of the Year (winning both the Wooden and Naismith award), a unanimous All-American, and Big Ten Player of the Year. Cheaney spent 13 years in the NBA playing for five different teams.

Early life
Born in Evansville, Indiana, Cheaney played high school ball at William Henry Harrison High School in Evansville and was selected to the 1989 Indiana All-Star team. Cheaney was a high school stand-out, but a season-ending injury midway through his senior year pushed him off the national radar and left him as a virtual unknown in Indiana University's #1 ranked recruiting class of 1989.

College career
Cheaney played small forward for the Indiana University Hoosiers for head coach Bob Knight. He was Knight's first left-handed player. Cheaney was known as a smooth leader all four years at Indiana. During the last three of his years at Indiana, the team spent all but two of the 53 poll weeks in the top 10, and 38 of them in the top 5. The Hoosiers were 87–16 (.845) those years and a 46–8 (.852) mark in the Big Ten Conference. Of the four years Cheaney played the Hoosiers went 105-27 and captured two Big Ten crowns ('91 and '93). The 105 games won during Cheaney's four years was the most of any Hoosier to that point.

Freshman year
Cheaney began his career with a flash, scoring 20 points in the season opener of his freshman year (the only Indiana freshman to ever do so). However, the 1989–90 team ran into tougher competition in January after winning all 10 of their pre-conference games. Taken aback by the intensity of play within the Big Ten, the young Hoosier squad went 8–10 in conference play and were upset by California in their NCAA Tournament opening game. Cheaney averaged 17 points a game as a freshman.

“Our freshman year was very, very subpar,” Cheaney said. “We started out excellent and when we got into the Big Ten we were in for a rude awakening. I knew once that season was over and we started working out over the summer, we were going to become a pretty good team. I knew we were going to be a team to be reckoned with the next three years."

Sophomore year
Cheaney averaged 21.6 points per game as a sophomore, with the Hoosiers ending the 1990–91 regular season with an overall record of 29–5 and a conference record of 15–3, finishing 1st in the Big Ten Conference. As conference champions, the Hoosiers were invited to participate in the 1991 NCAA Tournament as a 2-seed, where they advanced to the Sweet Sixteen. Cheaney noted, “I had a very good sophomore year, but I played a lot of international ball. I played on the Tournament of America team and the World University team. I think I wore myself out a little bit, and when my junior year rolled around, I wasn’t up to par.”

Junior year
As a junior during the 1991–92 season, Cheaney felt he struggled from being worn down by substantial play over the summer. Moreover, with the addition of other talent from players like Alan Henderson, Cheaney "didn’t have to score as much." He regressed to an average of 17.6 points per game and his three-point shooting percentage dropped significantly. The Hoosiers finished the regular season with an overall record of 27–7 and a conference record of 14–4, finishing 2nd in the Big Ten Conference. The Hoosiers were invited to participate in the 1992 NCAA Tournament as a 2-seed, where they advanced to the Final Four, but fell to Duke in a foul-plagued game in Minneapolis.

In the West Regional final while preparing to face UCLA in Albuquerque, just before practice ended, head coach Bob Knight ran the whip across Cheaney`s backside as Cheaney, the team`s leading scorer, was bent over, with his shorts pulled down slightly. On Thursday, both Albuquerque newspapers published photographs of the incident. Cheaney appeared to be laughing in one of the photos.

Senior year
As a senior during the 1992–93 season, Cheaney averaged 22.4 points per game and 6.2 rebounds per game. The Hoosiers finished the regular season with an overall record of 31–4 and a conference record of 17–1, finishing 1st in the Big Ten Conference. As the Big Ten Conference Champions, the Hoosiers were invited to participate in the 1993 NCAA Tournament as a 1-seed, where they advanced to the Elite Eight for the second year in a row, but were defeated by Kansas.

Over the course of his career at Indiana, Cheaney scored 30 or more points thirteen times and averaged 19.8 points per game, with a high of 22.4 as senior. With 2,613 career points, he is the all-time leading scorer of both Indiana and the Big Ten. At the conclusion of his collegiate career, Cheaney had captured virtually every post-season honor available. He was the National Player of the Year (winning both the Wooden and Naismith award), a unanimous All-America, and Big Ten Player of the Year.

College statistics

|+College statistics
|-
| style="text-align:left;"| 1989–90
| style="text-align:left;"| Indiana
| 29 || 29 || 32.0 || .572 || .490 || .750 || 4.6 || 1.7 || .8 || .6 || 17.1
|-
| style="text-align:left;"| 1990–91
| style="text-align:left;"| Indiana
| 34 || 34 || 30.3 || .596 || .473 || .801 || 5.5 || 1.4 || .7 || .4 || 21.6
|-
| style="text-align:left;"| 1991–92
| style="text-align:left;"| Indiana
| 34 || 32 || 29.1 || .522 || .384 || .800 || 4.9 || 1.4 || 1.1 || .2 || 17.6
|-
| style="text-align:left;"| 1992–93
| style="text-align:left;"| Indiana
| 35 || 35 || 33.7 || .549 || .427 || .795 || 6.4 || 2.4 || .9|| .3 || 22.4
|- class="sortbottom"
| style="text-align:center;" colspan="2"| Career
| 132 || 130 || 31.3 || .559 || .438 || .790 || 5.4 || 1.7 || .9 || .3 || 19.8

Professional career

NBA career
Cheaney was selected 6th overall by the Washington Bullets in the 1993 NBA draft. His strongest showing as pro came in 1994–1995 when he averaged a career-high 16.6 points for Washington. He spent six years playing for the Bullets/Wizards (including a playoff appearance in 1997). He would go on to play for the Boston Celtics, Denver Nuggets, and Utah Jazz, before closing his career out with three years with the Golden State Warriors, retiring after the 2005–06 season. During his thirteen-year NBA career, Cheaney played for five different teams, averaging 9.5 points and 3.2 rebounds.

Cheaney appeared along with many of his 1997 Bullet teammates (Juwan Howard, Ben Wallace, and Ashraf Amaya) in singer Crystal Waters' 1996 video "Say If You Feel Alright". He also appeared in the 1994 film Blue Chips as a player for the Indiana University Hoosiers.

Post-NBA
Following his retirement as a player, Cheaney spent two seasons on the staff for the Golden State Warriors. He was a special assistant in the front office in 2009–10, and in 2010–11 he was an assistant coach under fellow Indiana alumnus Keith Smart. He then returned to Indiana in 2011 and served as Director of Basketball Operations under coach Tom Crean. The following year he added the title of Director of Internal and External Player Development.

On August 21, 2013, Cheaney announced that he had accepted an assistant coach position at Saint Louis University under head coach Jim Crews, a fellow alumnus of Indiana University. During his first season with St. Louis in 2013–14 the Billikens finished with a 27–7 record and secured an Atlantic 10 Conference regular-season title and an NCAA Tournament appearance. Cheaney left the St. Louis staff in 2016 with the departure of Crews as head coach.

Basketball honors
 1993: Won all 12 NCAA National Player of the year awards.  Unanimous First-Team All America
 All-America 1991, 1992, 1993
 1993 Big Ten Conference MVP
 All-Big Ten 1991, 1992, 1993
 Big Ten's All Time Scoring Leader (2,613)
 Indiana University's All-Time leading scorer
 Four time IU team MVP
 Selected to Indiana University's All-Century First Team
 1993 USBWA College Player of the Year

References

External links

NBA.com Profile
Oscar Robertson Trophy

1971 births
Living people
20th-century African-American sportspeople
21st-century African-American sportspeople
African-American basketball players
All-American college men's basketball players
American men's basketball players
Basketball coaches from Indiana
Basketball players from Indiana
Boston Celtics players
College Park Skyhawks coaches
Denver Nuggets players
Erie BayHawks (2017–2019) coaches
Golden State Warriors players
Indiana Hoosiers men's basketball players
Medalists at the 1991 Summer Universiade
Saint Louis Billikens men's basketball coaches
Shooting guards
Small forwards
Sportspeople from Evansville, Indiana
Universiade gold medalists for the United States
Universiade medalists in basketball
Utah Jazz players
Washington Bullets draft picks
Washington Bullets players
Washington Wizards players